Wood Pigeon (Persian title: Toghi - )  is a 1970 Iranian drama film directed by Ali Hatami and starring Behrouz Vossoughi, Afarin Obeysi, Naser Malek Motiee, Zhaleh Olov, Hamideh Kheirabadi and Bahman Mofid.

Cast 
 Behrouz Vossoughi as Ased Morteza
 Afarin Obeysi as Tooba
 Naser Malek Motiee as Ased Mostafa
 Zhaleh Olov as Bi Bi
 Hamideh Kheirabadi as Tooba's mother
 Bahman Mofid as Javad khaldar
 Gholamreza Sarkoub as Abbas Garichi
 Mohsen Arrasteh
 Hossein Gil

References

1970 films
Iranian black-and-white films
1970 drama films
1970s Persian-language films
Films directed by Ali Hatami
Iranian drama films